The FIBA South American Under-15 Championship is a basketball tournament for junior men, that is held about every two years. It is contested between the ten countries of South America, and it is organized in part by FIBA Americas. Through 2012, the tournament had been held 25 times. In the past, the tournament has also been called the FIBA South America Championship for Cadets, and the FIBA South America Under-16 Championship.

Summaries

Performances by nation

Participation details

See also
FIBA South America Under-17 Championship
FIBA South America Under-21 Championship

External links
 Brazil history

Under-15
South
Basketball U15